Miss Rockefeller Is Filming is a 1922 German silent comedy film directed by Erich Schönfelder and starring Paul Otto, Stella Arbenina and Georg Alexander.

The film's sets were designed by the art director Rudi Feld.

Cast
Paul Otto as Dr. Arne Larsen
Stella Arbenina as Sigrid
Georg Alexander as Dr. Einar Osten
Hermann Picha as Nielson, Film director
Albert Paulig as Count Rosencrantz
Henry Bender as Dr. Kokolores
Hans Junkermann as Marquis Vidal
Charlotte Kinder as Liane Laroche, eine Frau, new employee
Grete Lundt as Nuja-Naja, Film diva
A. Oberg as Mister Rockefeller

References

External links

Films of the Weimar Republic
German silent feature films
Films directed by Erich Schönfelder
German black-and-white films
1922 comedy films
German comedy films
Films about filmmaking
Silent comedy films
1920s German films
1920s German-language films